Polar Ice Cream Sdn Bhd (doing business as Polar Ice Cream) is one of the largest ice cream suppliers company in Malaysia since 1988. The company produces a variety of ice cream that is distributed in supermarkets, convenience stores, food services and mobile hawkers all over Malaysia.

History 
The company started from a small factory on Balakong Road, Selangor with only 5 workers, producing a wide range of ice cream such as ice cream sticks, ice cream in cups, ice cream in cones, ice cream in tubs and ice cream with wafers but only limited to Malaysia during that time. On 6 March 2010, the company opened its new factory. Since then, Polar Ice Cream is distributed to China, New Zealand, Vietnam, Myanmar, Taiwan, Laos, Cambodia, Singapore and Brunei. Beside that, the company also planned to enter India, Sri Lanka and Middle East markets.

See also 

 List of ice cream brands

References

External links 
 

1988 establishments in Malaysia
Frozen food brands
Ice cream brands
Malaysian brands
Food and drink companies established in 1988
Manufacturing companies established in 1988
Privately held companies of Malaysia
Malaysian companies established in 1988